Yusif Nabiyev (born on 3 September 1997 in Ağstafa, Azerbaijan) is an Azerbaijani professional footballer who plays as a defender for Gabala in the Azerbaijan Premier League.

Career

Club
On 6 August 2016, Nabiyev made his debut in the Azerbaijan Premier League for Sumgayit match against Zira.

Personal life
Yusif is older brother of Viktoria Žižkov player Farid Nabiyev.

Honours

International
Azerbaijan U23
 Islamic Solidarity Games: (1) 2017

References

External links
 

1997 births
Living people
Association football defenders
Azerbaijani footballers
Azerbaijan under-21 international footballers
Azerbaijan youth international footballers
Gabala FC players
Sumgayit FK players
Zira FK players
Azerbaijan Premier League players